André and Ursula is a 1955 West German drama film directed by Werner Jacobs and starring Ivan Desny, Elisabeth Müller and Ina Peters. It was based on the 1937 novel of the same title by Polly Maria Höfler. The film updates the book's storyline from the First to the Second World War. It was shot at the Bavaria Studios in Munich. The film's sets were designed by the art director Franz Bi and Bruno Monden.

Cast
 Ivan Desny as André Duval
 Elisabeth Müller as Ursula Hartmann
 Walter Clemens as Gaston Duval / Andrés Bruder
 Ina Peters as Mimi Duval – Andrés Schwester
 Mária Tasnádi Fekete as Angéle Senard – Andrés Tante
 Denise Cormand as Jeanne Boulier
 Ulrich Bettac as Père Dominique – Pater
 Hans Henn as Henri
 Hans von Morhart as Pächter Boulier – Jeannes Vater
 Ernst Stankovski as Wendelin
 Dieter Wieland as Georg
 Ingmar Zeisberg as Nora
 Christiane Zentgraf as Klein-Ursula

References

Bibliography
 Hans-Michael Bock and Tim Bergfelder. The Concise Cinegraph: An Encyclopedia of German Cinema. Berghahn Books, 2009.

External links
 

1955 films
1955 drama films
German drama films
West German films
1950s German-language films
Films directed by Werner Jacobs
Films based on German novels
German black-and-white films
1950s German films
Films shot at Bavaria Studios